Bullata guerrinii is a species of sea snail, a marine gastropod mollusk in the family Marginellidae, the margin snails.

Description
The size of the shell varies between 20 mm and 37 mm. The shell shows distinct cream spots against a caramel or dark brown background. There are faint upward spiraling bands on the shell. The lip has a moderate thickness. The long aperture is about as broad as the thickness of the lip.

Distribution
This species occurs in the Atlantic Ocean off Eastern Brazil.

References

External links
 de Souza P.J.S. & Coovert J.A. (2001). Revision of the Recent Bullata Jousseaume, 1875 (Gastropoda: Marginellidae) with the description of two new species. The Nautilus 115(1): 1-14
 

Marginellidae
Gastropods described in 2001